Aluminium powder is powdered aluminium.

This was originally produced by mechanical means using a stamp mill to create flakes. Subsequently, a process of spraying molten aluminium to create a powder of droplets was developed by E. J. Hall in the 1920s. The resulting powder might then be processed further in a ball mill to flatten it into flakes for use as a coating or pigment.

Characteristics
The melting point of aluminium powder is 660 °C.

Usage 
 autoclave aerated concrete
 cosmetic colourant
 fingerprint powder
 metallic paint
 pyrotechnics (including the M-80 firecracker)
 refractory
 rocket and missile fuel such as the solid rocket boosters of the Space Shuttle
 thermite

Depending on the usage, the powder is either coated or uncoated.

Safety
Aluminium is insoluble.  If the powder or dust is breathed in then little of it will be absorbed but it may interfere with the clearance mechanism of the lung.  High levels of exposure over many years may result in aluminosis which causes pulmonary fibrosis.

Aluminium powder and dust is highly flammable and creates a significant risk of fire or explosion.  There have been many incidents in industries which produce such dusts and powders.

See also
 Metal powder

References

External links 
 https://www.cdc.gov/niosh/ipcsneng/neng0988.html

Aluminium
Aluminum objects
Powders